José Manuel Vela Bargues (1962 – 16 July 2022) was a Spanish economist and politician from the Valencian Community. Vela served as the Valencian  from 22 June 2011 until his resignation on 30 November 2012. Vela was a member of the People's Party (PP).

Biography 
Vela was born in Valencia in 1962. He attended the University of Valencia, where he graduated in 1986 with a degree in economic and business science. He later received a doctorate in economics from the University of Valencia. Vela was a professor of financial economics and accounting at the Polytechnic University of Valencia and was the vice-rector at Jaume I University. Vela was a member of the Spanish Association of Accounting and Business Administration since 1991, and authored over 100 works on economics.

Vela served in various positions in the Government of Valencia prior to his appointment as minister. Vela served as director of the Valencian Institute of Statistics, Undersecretary of Budget Policy and Treasury, and Autonomous Secretary of Economy and Budgets.

Vela was retained in the government of Camps's successor, Alberto Fabra. In his position as Minister of Finance, Vela was tasked with leading Valencia through the Great Recession. As part of his response to the recession, Vela would oversee the reduction of wages for public employees and the restructuring of the public sector.

During the course of the investigation, Vela allegedly leaked confidential information regarding the case to Blasco. Later that day, the  announced that charges would be filed against Vela, but these charges were ultimately dismissed.

Vela died on 16 July 2022 at the age of 60. Politicians from across the political spectrum commemorated Vela's death, with both PP leader Carlos Mazón and the opposing Spanish Socialist Workers' Party both offering condolences.

References 

1962 births
2022 deaths
Place of death missing
People from Valencia
University of Valencia alumni
Academic staff of the University of Valencia
Academic staff of the Technical University of Valencia
Academic staff of Jaume I University
Spanish economists
21st-century Spanish politicians
People's Party (Spain) politicians
Economy ministers of the Valencian Community